Joe Harrington (born December 28, 1945) is an American basketball coach. He last served as the Director of Men's Basketball Student Services at the Maryland. Harrington served as the head coach at Hofstra University, George Mason University, California State University, Long Beach, and the University of Colorado. He was an assistant coach with the Toronto Raptors in the National Basketball Association.

Biography
Harrington was the star of Morse High School's back-to-back state championship teams in 1962–63. He attended the University of Maryland, where he played college basketball under Maryland head coach Bud Millikan and alongside point guard Gary Williams. The Boston Celtics selected Harrington in the 1967 NBA Draft.

Harrington served as the head coach at Hofstra for the 1979–80 season. From 1980 to 1986, he coached at George Mason, where he compiled a 112–85 record. From 1987 to 1990, he coached at Long Beach State, where he compiled a 53–36 record. From 1990 to 1996, he served as the head coach at Colorado, where he compiled a 72–85 record. Harrington served as a manager for the US national team in the 1990 FIBA World Championship, which won the bronze medal. He worked as an assistant coach for the Toronto Raptors from 1998 to 2000. In November 2008, he joined former teammate Gary Williams' coaching staff at their alma mater, Maryland, as the Director of Men's Basketball Student Services.

Head coaching record

References

1945 births
Living people
American expatriate basketball people in Canada
American men's basketball coaches
American men's basketball players
Basketball coaches from Maine
Basketball players from Maine
Boston Celtics draft picks
College men's basketball head coaches in the United States
Colorado Buffaloes men's basketball coaches
George Mason Patriots men's basketball coaches
Hofstra Pride men's basketball coaches
Long Beach State Beach men's basketball coaches
Maryland Terrapins men's basketball coaches
Maryland Terrapins men's basketball players
People from Sagadahoc County, Maine
Toronto Raptors assistant coaches